Little Oak Ranch was a family ranch in Vacaville, California.

It was the birthplace of Willis Linn Jepson. Many of his botanical collections were made in and around this area. The ranch no longer exists, but was located southeast of the intersection of what are now Peabody and Alamo Roads in Vacaville.

References

History of Solano County, California
Ranches in California
Vacaville, California